The Stony Brook Seawolves football program is a college football team that represents the State University of New York at Stony Brook in the Football Championship Subdivision (FCS) of National Collegiate Athletic Association Division I. They will begin play in the Colonial Athletic Association (CAA) in 2013, after having played the previous five seasons in the Big South Conference.

In its short history, Stony Brook has had two head coaches since its first NCAA sanctioned season in 1984. Sam Kornhauser was the team's first head coach and guided the Seawolves through twenty-two seasons. As a head coach, Kornhauser transitioned the football team from a regional Division III program to a Division I program culminating his career with Stony Brook's first ever Division I conference championship as a member of the Northeast Conference

In 2006, Chuck Priore took the reins of the program. Together with the administration, he elevated Stony Brook football from a non-scholarship program to a program that funds the FCS maximum of 63 scholarships. Priore led the Seawolves to four consecutive Big South Conference championships (2009 through 2012). In 2011, Stony Brook claimed their first ever NCAA Division I Football Championship (FCS playoff) bid and advanced to the second round of the tournament. The Seawolves returned to the FCS playoffs in 2012, again advancing to the second round. Priore has also worked with the administration to increase the strength of schedule and grow the program as a national power in Division I FCS.

Coaching history

Key

Coaches

Notes

References

Stony Brook
 
Lists of sportspeople from New York (state)
Stony Brook Seawolves football coaches